Lamèque Island, (formerly Shippegan Island or Shippigan Island), is a Canadian island in the Gulf of St. Lawrence at the northeastern tip of Gloucester County, New Brunswick.

It is separated from mainland North America on the south by the Shippagan Gut with the island forming Lameque Bay, Shippagan Harbour and Shippagan Bay west of this channel. The island is separated from Miscou Island on the north by the Miscou Channel, with both islands forming Miscou Harbour.

The Shippagan Gut is bridged between the town of Shippagan on the mainland to the local service district of Chiasson-Savoy on Lamèque Island by a  combination causeway-bridge with a lift bridge over a navigation channel for small craft.

The Miscou Channel is bridged between the community of Little Shippagan on Lamèque Island to the community of Miscou Harbour on Miscou Island by the 2000 metre Miscou Island Bridge.

Lamèque Island and Miscou Island separate Chaleur Bay from the Gulf of Saint Lawrence.

See also

List of lighthouses in New Brunswick
Acadian Peninsula
Lamèque, New Brunswick
Shippagan, New Brunswick
List of communities in New Brunswick
List of islands of New Brunswick

References

External links
Lamèque International Baroque Music Festival

Coastal islands of New Brunswick
Landforms of Gloucester County, New Brunswick